The Loose Special, also called the Townsend A-1 Special, the Loose-Siem Special and the Townsend Special is a small air racer developed for the Thompson Trophy races.

Design
The Loose Special is a small single seat racer with conventional landing gear and a cable-braced mid-wing. The engine was replaced with an  Continental to compete in the Formula One air races.

Operational history
The Loose Special participated in 1933, 1935 and 1938 air races.

Specifications (Loose Siem Special)

References

External links
Image of the Loose Special

Racing aircraft
Mid-wing aircraft
Aircraft first flown in 1933